Cambaroides sachalinensis is a species of freshwater crayfish endemic to Sakhalin, Russia.

References

Cambaridae
Freshwater crustaceans of Asia
Crustaceans described in 1841